Kembla was an electoral district of the Legislative Assembly in the Australian State of New South Wales for a single term from 1968 to 1971, named after the Mount Kembla or Port Kembla. It replaced part of Wollongong-Kembla and Illawarra and was replaced by Illawarra. Its only member was George Petersen.

Members for Kembla

Election results

References

Kembla
1968 establishments in Australia
Constituencies established in 1968
1971 disestablishments in Australia
Constituencies disestablished in 1971